Manjilabad Rural District is in the Central District of Robat Karim County, Tehran province, Iran. At the National Census of 2006, its population was 48,679 in 12,442 households. There were 77,681 inhabitants in 21,406 households at the following census of 2011. At the most recent census of 2016, the population of the rural district was 45,986 in 13,091 households. The largest of its 27 villages was Alard, with 11,616 people.

References 

Robat Karim County

Rural Districts of Tehran Province

Populated places in Tehran Province

Populated places in Robat Karim County